The Pride of Palomar is a 1922 American silent drama film directed by Frank Borzage and written by Grant Carpenter, Peter B. Kyne, and John Lynch. The film stars Forrest Stanley, Marjorie Daw, Tote Du Crow, James O. Barrows, Joseph J. Dowling, and Alfred Allen. The film was released on November 26, 1922, by Paramount Pictures.

A print of this film is preserved in the Library of Congress collection.

Set at the "Rancho El Palomar", it was filmed largely at Rancho Guajome and Mission San Luis Rey in Vista and Oceanside, CA, respectively.  As such, it gives some valuable glimpses of these two historical sites as they were about a century ago (though the back of the ranch building was stuccoed for the movie, which one can still see at Guajome). It also shows a few scenes featuring Pullman porters and dining cars of the 1920s.  The movie was unusual in showing some kind of themed background to the intertitles.

Cast 

Forrest Stanley as Don Mike Farrell
Marjorie Daw as Kay Parker
Tote Du Crow as Pablo
James O. Barrows as Father Dominic 
Joseph J. Dowling as Don Miguel 
Alfred Allen as John Parker
George Nichols as Conway
Warner Oland as Okada
Mrs. Jessie Hebbard as Mrs. Parker
Percy Williams as Butler
Anna Dodge as Caroline 
Ed Brady as Lossolet
Carmen Arselle as Anita Supvelda
Eagle Eye as Nogi 
Most Mattoe as Alexandria

References

External links 

 
 
 The Pride of Palomar at silentera.com

1922 films
1920s English-language films
Silent American drama films
1922 drama films
Paramount Pictures films
Films directed by Frank Borzage
American black-and-white films
American silent feature films
1920s American films